The Principles and Practice of Engineering exam is the examination required for one to become a Professional Engineer (PE) in the United States.  It is the second exam required, coming after the Fundamentals of Engineering exam.

Upon passing the PE exam and meeting other eligibility requirements, that vary by state, such as education and experience, an engineer can then become registered in their State to stamp and sign engineering drawings and calculations as a PE.

While the PE itself is sufficient for most engineering fields, some states require a further certification for structural engineers.  These require the passing of the Structural I exam and/or the Structural II exam.

The PE Exam is created and scored by the National Council of Examiners for Engineering and Surveying (NCEES). NCEES is a national non-profit organization composed of engineering and surveying licensing boards representing all states and U.S. territories.

Exam format
Exams are offered twice a year, once in April and once in October, and are discipline-specific. With the exception of the Structural exam, each exam is eight hours long, consisting of two 4-hour sessions administered in a single day with a lunch break. There are 40 multiple-choice questions per session. Several disciplines require a common morning breadth exam which broadly covers the discipline and then a more detailed afternoon depth exam where the test taker selects a more detailed area of the discipline. Other disciplines essentially have morning and afternoon breadth exams.

The Structural exam is 16 hours long and administered over two days, with two 4-hour sessions and a lunch break per day. Morning breadth sessions consist of 40 multiple-choice questions, while the afternoon depth sessions require essay responses. An examinee must earn a passing score on both days' exams in order to pass overall, but need not obtain those scores during the same administration of the exam. In computer-based test (CBT) examinees are given access to on-screen reference manuals but for non CBT exams examinees are allowed to carry reference manuals, codes and spirally bided documents.

NCEES began the process of transitioning exams to computer-based testing (CBT) in 2011. NCEES has successfully converted some of the exams and all other NCEES exams are currently in the conversion process and scheduled to launch in computer-based format between now and 2024. Some CBT exams are administered year-round. Other CBT exams that have a smaller examinee population use a different high-stakes testing model and are administered on a single day each year.

Disciplines

PE exams are offered for the following disciplines:
Agricultural and Biological Engineering (new specifications for the April 2015 exam)
Architectural
Chemical
Civil: Construction (new specifications and design standards for the 2015 exams)
Civil: Geotechnical (new specifications and design standards for the 2015 exams)
Civil: Structural (new specifications and design standards for the 2015 exams)
Civil: Transportation (new specifications and design standards for the 2015 exams)
Civil: Water Resources and Environmental (new specifications and design standards for the 2015 exams)
Control Systems
Electrical and Computer: Computer Engineering (Study Guide: Computer Engineering Compendium)
Electrical and Computer: Electrical and Electronics
Electrical and Computer: Power
Environmental
Fire Protection
Industrial
Mechanical: HVAC and Refrigeration
Mechanical: Mechanical Systems and Materials
Mechanical: Thermal and Fluids Systems
Metallurgical and Materials (new specifications and design standards for the 2015 exams)
Mining and Mineral Processing
Naval Architecture and Marine Engineering
Nuclear
Petroleum
Structural(with design standards for the 2015 exams)

Unlike the Fundamentals of Engineering Exam, outside reference sources are allowed for the PE Exam. The general rule is that any such materials must be in some sort of permanent binding (book, three-ring, spiral, etc.); loose papers and notes are prohibited. No writing tools or scratch paper may be brought in, and only calculators specifically approved by NCEES may be used. Examinees are provided with mechanical pencils and may use the test booklet as scratch paper for solving problems.

Pass rates
The PE exam is a professional exam much like the examinations required for public accounting, law, and other professions for which protection of the public is of the utmost concern. Consequently, exam candidates typically spend large amounts of time preparing for the exam. Exam pass rates vary by discipline module and test date, for the April 2010 exam, the pass rates for first time test takers ranged from 85% (Naval Architecture) to 46% (Structural I). The pass rates for repeat test takers is considerably lower.

October 2016 Exam

See also
National Council of Examiners for Engineering and Surveying (NCEES)
Fundamentals of Engineering Examination (FE exam)
Graduate Aptitude Test in Engineering (GATE)
Engineer
Engineering
Regulation and licensure in engineering
Glossary of engineering
Glossary of civil engineering
Glossary of electrical and electronics engineering
Glossary of mechanical engineering
Glossary of structural engineering
Glossary of biology
Glossary of chemistry
Glossary of economics
Glossary of physics
Glossary of probability and statistics

References

External links

Standardized tests in the United States
Engineering education
Professional certification in engineering